Orthodox Judaism outreach commonly referred to as Kiruv or Keruv, is the  movement of Orthodox Judaism that reaches out to non-Orthodox Jews to  practice the Mitzvot in the hope that they will live according to Orthodox Jewish law.

Orthodox Judaism outreach may also refer to:
Modern Orthodox Judaism outreach
Noahide Campaign